Bratina Valley is an upland valley at the east side of Harris Ledge in the Olympus Range, McMurdo Dry Valleys; the valley opens north to McKelvey Valley. It was named by the Advisory Committee on Antarctic Names (2004) after Bonnie J. Bratina, Department of Microbiology, Michigan State University, East Lansing, Michigan, who was with the United States Antarctic Program for four seasons at Lake Vanda in the 1990s.

References
 

Valleys of Victoria Land
McMurdo Dry Valleys